State Highway 20 (SH 20) is a  highway maintained by the Texas Department of Transportation (TxDOT) that runs from New Mexico State Road 460 at the state line between Texas and New Mexico at Anthony in El Paso County to Interstate 10 at McNary in Hudspeth County.  It largely follows a former alignment of U.S. Route 80. The route passes through the city of El Paso as well as suburban and rural farming communities along the Rio Grande. With the exception of a stretch north of central El Paso where the route crosses north of I-10, the route generally runs in a narrow belt between I-10 and the Rio Grande. The route has connections to every international border crossing with Mexico in the El Paso area and has important intersections with US 54, US 62, US 85, and US 180.

Until the late 1930s, the route designation belonged to a highway in central Texas along the route of present-day US 290. The current route predates the Texas highway system having been a portion of several historic auto trails. The route was included at the creation of the state system as part of SH 1. With the establishment of the U.S. numbered highway system, the route became US 80 and the SH 1 designation was eventually dropped. SH 20 was designated over the route when US 80 was relocated over I-10 before it too was decommissioned in western Texas.

History

Previous route

Current route
Before the state established its highway system, the route of SH 20 was used by many historic auto trails including the Dixie Overland Highway, the Old Spanish Trail, the Lee Highway, the Jefferson Davis National Highway, and the Bankhead Highway.

The current SH 20 was originally a part of the former SH 1, a route that from the current eastern terminus of the present route continued on through Van Horn, Odessa, Midland, Abilene, Fort Worth, and Dallas before entering Arkansas at Texarkana. This route was also one of the original routes planned in 1917, and remained largely unchanged until the end of the 1930s.

In 1927, US 80 was designated over the route of SH 1 from the New Mexico state line at Anthony to Dallas and then proceeding east to the Louisiana state line east of Waskom. The highway carried both the US 80 and SH 1 designations until the 1939 general redescription of the state highway system when SH 1 was decommissioned outside the city of Dallas. In 1944, the full length of US 80 within Texas was designated as the Veterans of World War II Highway. US 80 was relocated over I-10 through El Paso on April 2, 1969, and its former route was then renamed SH 20. US 80 was decommissioned west of Dallas on August 28, 1991.

Route description
SH 20 begins where NM 460 (Co-signed with NM 478), also called Anthony Dr., reaches the state line between Anthony, New Mexico and Anthony, Texas in the El Paso area's Upper Valley. The route proceeds south through Anthony along Main St. passing Federal Correctional Institution, La Tuna. The route then enters Vinton where it becomes Doniphan Dr. Further south in Canutillo the route intersects Loop 375, El Paso's beltway. After entering the city of El Paso, the route intersects SH 178 which connects the route via NM 136 to the international border with Mexico south of Santa Teresa, New Mexico. Further south, SH 20 turns off of Doniphan Dr. and onto Mesa St. and soon after crosses the I-10 freeway which also carries US 85 and US 180 at this point. The route continues to the southeast passing through the foothills of the Franklin Mountains. The route then passes the University of Texas at El Paso and Sun Bowl Stadium before entering central El Paso.

In central El Paso, the route crosses I-10 and US 180 again and then soon after turns northeast on Texas Ave. where the route crosses Santa Fe St. and Stanton St. leading to the Paso del Norte International Bridge and Good Neighbor International Bridge to Ciudad Juárez. The route then turns east along Alameda Ave. The route then crosses Loop 478 before crossing the unsigned I-110 and US 54 at the Patriot Freeway which leads to the international Bridge of the Americas. The route crosses US 62 at Paisano Dr. before the route turns southeast at Ascarate Park and enters the Lower Valley.

At Zaragoza Rd., which leads to the Ysleta-Zaragoza International Bridge, the route intersects FM 258 and passes Ysleta Mission in the Ysleta del Sur Pueblo Native American reservation. The route crosses Loop 375 again before entering Socorro where the route continues along Alameda. Further to the southeast at Clint, SH 20 crosses FM 1110 to San Elizario. In Fabens, where SH 20 is known as Main St., the route crosses FM 76 which leads toward the Fabens-Caseta International Bridge. The route passes through Tornillo as Alameda Ave. again before leaving El Paso County.

In Hudspeth County, the route intersects Spur 148 which passes through central Fort Hancock. A short distance later, the route intersects FM 1088 which connects Fort Hancock to the Fort Hancock – El Porvenir International Bridge. At McNary, the route intersects FM 2217 which continues along the Lower Valley, and then terminates at I-10.

Major intersections

See also

References

External links

020
Transportation in El Paso County, Texas
Transportation in Hudspeth County, Texas
U.S. Route 80